Fjordabladet is a Norwegian newspaper, published three times a week in Nordfjordeid in Vestland county.

It started on 10 July 1874 as Fjordenes Blad, the Liberal Party organ in the region Nordfjord. A driving force behind the establishment was Otto Blehr, and the first editor-in-chief (until 1882) was Edvard Storm Blom. From 1885 to 1892, when Mons Syltevik was editor, the newspaper leaned more towards the Moderate Liberal Party, but with the editorship of John Myklebust it then returned to its Liberal allegiance which lasted throughout the party newspaper period.

Fjordabladet is owned by Fjordtrykk, which is in turn owned 32.5% by Sunnmørsposten, 9.9% by competitor Fjordingen, 14.7% by Adfons and 42.9% by small, local owners. The newspaper is issued three days a week, and has a circulation of 2,796, among whom 2,620 are subscribers.

References

External links

Publications established in 1874
1874 establishments in Norway
Newspapers published in Norway
Mass media in Sogn og Fjordane
Stad, Norway
Liberal Party (Norway) newspapers